Juancheng County falls under the jurisdiction of Heze, in the southwest of Shandong province, China. The population is approximately 800,000.

Administrative divisions
As of 2012, this County is divided to 10 towns and 6 townships.
Towns

Townships

Climate

References

Counties of Shandong
Heze